The Women's 200m butterfly event at the 2010 South American Games was held on March 28, with the heats at 11:19 and the Final at 18:25.

Medalists

Records

Results

Heats

Final

References
Heats
Final

Butterfly 200m W